The Zira FK 2017-18 season was Zira's fourth Azerbaijan Premier League season, and fifth season in their history.

Season events
On 29 August, Aykhan Abbasov resigned as Zira's manager, with Samir Abbasov being appointed as his replacement the same day.

Squad

Transfers

In

Out

Loans in

Released

Friendlies

Competitions

Overview

Premier League

Results summary

Results

League table

Azerbaijan Cup

Squad statistics

Appearances and goals

|-
|colspan="14"|Players away from Zira on loan:
|-
|colspan="14"|Players who left Zira during the season:

|}

Goal scorers

Disciplinary record

References

Azerbaijani football clubs 2018–19 season
Zira FK